Alonso Miguel Gamero Zúñiga (born 23 December 1992) is a Peruvian road cyclist, who currently rides for Peruvian amateur team Ciclismo Extremo Peruano.

Major results

2010
 National Junior Road Championships
1st  Time trial
2nd Road race
2011
 3rd  Time trial, South American Under-23 Road Championships
2013
 National Under-23 Road Championships
2nd Road race
2nd Time trial
2014
 National Under-23 Road Championships
1st  Road race
1st  Time trial
2015
 2nd Overall Vuelta a Perú
1st Stage 4
2016
 1st  Road race, National Road Championships
2017
 National Road Championships
1st  Road race
1st  Time trial
 2nd Overall Vuelta a Perú
1st Stage 4
2018
 1st  Road race, National Road Championships
 1st Stage 3 Vuelta al Ecuador
 6th Overall Vuelta a Guatemala
1st Stages 1, 2 & 9
 9th Road race, South American Games
2019
 1st Stages 2 & 5 Vuelta a Chiriquí
 6th Road race, Pan American Games

References

External links

Peruvian male cyclists
Living people
People from Arequipa
1992 births
Pan American Games competitors for Peru
Cyclists at the 2019 Pan American Games
Cyclists at the 2015 Pan American Games
21st-century Peruvian people
20th-century Peruvian people